(born 24 June 1939) is a Japanese politician who served as the governor of Fukushima Prefecture of Japan from 1988 to 2006.

Sato was initially an enthusiastic supporter of nuclear power. Like his predecessors he appreciated the jobs and subsidies associated with the nuclear plants in the prefecture. He believed it was part of Fukushima playing a role in the Japanese nation as a whole. In 1998 he conditionally agreed the controversial use of mixed oxide plutonium uranium fuel (MOX) at the Fukushima plant, withdrawing his support after discovering a cover-up of reactor malfunctions and cracks.

Between 2002 and 2006 twenty-one problems at the Fukushima plant were reported to his office. The whistleblowers, including some employees at the plant, bypassed both Tepco and Japan's Nuclear and Industrial Safety Agency because they feared that their information would go straight to Tepco. This was later shown to be a very justified fear. Sato became an increasingly bitter critic of the plant and Japan's entire energy policy as directed by NISA's powerful government overseer, the Ministry of Economy, Trade and Industry.

In 2006 Sato was forced to step down and in 2008 was prosecuted and convicted on bribery charges. He claims the charges were politically motivated. Following the conviction he wrote a book of his experiences called Annihilating a Governor explaining his concerns about nuclear power and how he was set up and wrongfully convicted. The book was largely ignored until the events of the Fukushima Daiichi nuclear disaster sent it rocketing up the bestseller list.

References 
 
https://web.archive.org/web/20110427022229/http://www.fccj.or.jp/node/6542
 David McNeill: Warnings of nuclear disaster not heeded, claims former governor
 Cordula Meyer: Der Atomstaat - Der Spiegel 23. May 2011

Members of the House of Councillors (Japan)
Politicians from Fukushima Prefecture
Living people
1939 births